Journal for the Study of the Pseudepigrapha is a quarterly peer-reviewed academic journal that publishes scholarship on Jewish literature from the Hellenistic-Roman period. The journal operates a double-blind review process. Contributions focus on linguistic, textual, historic or theological insights to the Jewish literature found in, but not limited to, the pseudepigrapha and apocrypha. The editor-in-chief is Matthias Henze (Rice University). It was established in 1987 and is currently published by SAGE Publications.

Editorial Board: Randall D. Chesnutt (Malibu, CA), John J. Collins (New Haven, CT), Sidnie White Crawford (Lincoln, NE), John R. Levison (Seattle, WA), Hermann Lichtenberger (Tübingen). Liv Ingeborg Lied (Oslo), Doron Mendels (Jerusalem), Carol Newsom (Atlanta, GA), Eileen Schuller (Hamilton, Ontario), Michael E. Stone (Jerusalem), Benjamin Wold (Dublin), Archie T. Wright (Virginia Beach, CA).

Abstracting and indexing 
The Journal for the Study of the Pseudepigrapha is abstracted and indexed in:
 Academic Premier
 Advanced Placement Source
 ATLA Religion Database
 New Testament Abstracts
 Old Testament Abstracts
 Religion & Philosophy Collection

References

External links 
 

SAGE Publishing academic journals
English-language journals
Judaic studies journals
Publications established in 1987
Quarterly journals
Journals about ancient Christianity